Mikita Bukatkin (born 7 March 1988) is a Belarusian footballer.

International career
Bukatkin was a member of the Belarus U21 that finished in 3rd place at the 2011 UEFA European Under-21 Football Championship. He played 3 matches.

Honours
Naftan Novopolotsk
Belarusian Cup winner: 2011–12

Minsk
Belarusian Cup winner: 2012–13

Dinamo Brest
Belarusian Cup winner: 2016–17, 2017–18

External links

1988 births
Living people
Belarusian footballers
Association football midfielders
Belarusian expatriate footballers
Expatriate footballers in Uzbekistan
Expatriate footballers in Kazakhstan
FC Shakhtyor Soligorsk players
FC Naftan Novopolotsk players
FC Minsk players
FC Belshina Bobruisk players
FC Dynamo Brest players
FC Isloch Minsk Raion players
FC Rukh Brest players
FC Altai Semey players
FC Ostrovets players